Chemoselectivity is the preferential outcome of a chemical reaction over a set of possible alternative reactions. 

In another definition, chemoselectivity refers to the selective reactivity of one functional group in the presence of others; often this process in convoluted and protecting groups are on the molecular connectivity alone. Such predictions based on connectivity are generally considered plausible, but the physical outcome of the actual reaction is ultimately dependent on a number of factors that are practically impossible to predict to any useful accuracy (solvent, atomic orbitals, etc.).

Chemoselectivity can be difficult to predict, but observing selective outcomes in cases where many reactions are plausible, is common. Examples include the selective organic reduction of the greater relative chemoselectivity of sodium borohydride reduction versus lithium aluminium hydride reduction. In another example, the compound 4-methoxyacetophenone is oxidized by bleach at the ketone group at high pH (forming the carboxylic acid) and oxidized by EAS (to the aryl chloride) at low pH.

See also 
Regioselectivity
Stereoselectivity

References

Chemical reactions